The Tangkic languages form a small language family of Australian Aboriginal languages spoken in northern Australia.

The Tangkic languages are Lardil (Leerdil) and its special register Damin, Kayardild, and Yukulta (also known as Ganggalida or Nyangga). Of these Lardil is quite divergent, while Yukulta and Kayardild are mutually intelligible.

The extinct and poorly attested Minkin language may have been part of the Tangkic family.

Vocabulary
Capell (1942) lists the following basic vocabulary items:

{| class="wikitable sortable"
! English !! Laːdil !! Neːmarang
|-
! man
|  || 
|-
! woman
|  || 
|-
! head
|  || 
|-
! eye
|  || 
|-
! nose
|  || 
|-
! mouth
|  || 
|-
! tongue
|  || 
|-
! wallaby
|  || 
|-
! crow
|  || 
|-
! sun
|  || 
|-
! moon
|  || 
|-
! fire
|  || 
|-
! smoke
|  || 
|-
! water
|  || 
|-
! raft
|  || 
|-
! paddle
|  || 
|-
! father
|  || 
|-
! mother
|  || 
|-
! sky, above
| ,  || 
|-
! ground
|  || 
|-
! wind
|  || 
|-
! snake
|  || 
|-
! food
|  || 
|-
! ashes
|  || 
|-
! sea
|  || 
|-
! whirlwind
|  || 
|}

References

 
Language families
Non-Pama-Nyungan languages
Indigenous Australian languages in Queensland
Indigenous Australian languages in the Northern Territory